Enamorada is a 1986 Venezuelan telenovela produced and broadcast by Venevisión. The telenovela starred Puerto Rican actress Sully Diaz and Venezuelan actor Carlos Olivier.

Cast
Sully Diaz
Carlos Olivier
Ruddy Rodríguez
Cristián Reyes
Manuel Escolano
Ernesto Balzi

References

1986 telenovelas
Venevisión telenovelas
1980s Venezuelan television series
1986 Venezuelan television series debuts
1987 Venezuelan television series endings
Venezuelan telenovelas
Spanish-language telenovelas
Television shows set in Venezuela